Degerfors IF is a Swedish football club located in Degerfors. The club, formed 13 January 1907, is currently playing in the highest tier in Swedish football, Allsvenskan.

Background
Degerfors IF first played in the Allsvenskan in 1939 making use of their new home ground at Stora Valla. Up until 1966 the club regularly appeared in the Allsvenskan but in recent decades they have played at the highest level for 5 seasons from 1993 to 1997. Their record attendance is 21,065 spectators when Degerfors IF played IFK Norrköping in 1963.

The club is affiliated to the Värmlands Fotbollförbund.

Season to season

Players

First-team squad

Out on loan

Retired numbers
12 – Fans of the club

Staff

Current technical staff

Managers

 Arnold Andersson-Tagner (1936–37)
 István Wampetits (1937–44)
  Einar Skeppstedt (1945–47)
 Edmund Crawford (1948–49)
 Karl-Erik Jakobsson (1950)
 Imre Markos (1951–53)
 Gunnar Andersson (1953)
 Karl Neschy (1954–57)
 Olle Åhlund (1957–59)
 Bill Burnikell (1960–61)
 Tore Karlsson (1961)
 Gunnar Nordahl (1961–64)
 Vilmos Varszegi (1965–66)
 Ernst Bohlin (1961–67)
 Tore Karlsson (1968)
 Åke Klintberg (1969)
 Olle Åhlund (1970)
 Tore Karlsson (1971–72)
 Håkan Höglander (1973–74)
 Curt Edenvik (1975)
 Tord Grip (1976)
 Sven-Göran Eriksson (1977–78)
 Lars-Åke Bäckström (1979–80)
 Peter Pallman (1980)
 Janusz Pekowski (1981–82)
 Dave Mosson (1983–85)
 Björn Juhlin (1986–87)
 Lars Henriksson (1988)
 Kenneth Sundkvist (1989)
 Sören Cratz (1990–92)
 Börje Andersson (1993)
 Erik Hamrén (1994)
 Sören Cratz (1995–96)
 Bosse Nilsson (1997)
 Örjan Glans (1998)
 Kenneth Norling (1999–2001)
 Dave Mosson (2002–04)
 Tony Gustavsson (2005–06)
 Mark Selmer (2007)
 Milenko Vukčević (2007)
 Jan Stahre (2008)
 Patrik Werner (2009–2016)
 Stefan Jacobsson (2016–2019)
 Tobias Solberg and  Andreas Holmberg (2020–)

Achievements

League
Allsvenskan:
Runners-up (2): 1940–41, 1963
 Division 1 Norra:
 Winners (1): 2009

Cups
Svenska Cupen:
Winners (1): 1992–93

Footnotes

External links

Degerfors IF – official site
Vulkanerna – official supporter club site
Degerfors IF J – official site for the junior team

 
Football clubs in Örebro County
Allsvenskan clubs
Association football clubs established in 1907
1907 establishments in Sweden
Svenska Cupen winners